Keertan Dheda MBBCh (Wits), FCP(SA), FCCP, PhD (Lond), FRCP (Lond), born in 1969, is a Professor of Mycobacteriology and Global health at the London School of Hygiene and Tropical Medicine (LSHTM) with an extra-mural joint appointment at the University of Cape Town (UCT), where he is a Professor of Respiratory Medicine.

He is a global research leader in TB diagnosis and transmission, having published over 320 peer-reviewed papers, with a Google h-index of 87 and Scopus h-Index of 70.

Research 
His research work focuses on the molecular epidemiology, diagnosis, transmission, and treatment of Tuberculosis, as well as antimicrobial resistance of pulmonary pathogens such as Mycobacterium tuberculosis. He has a keen interest in medical education and interventional pulmonology including bronchial thermoplasty, ultrasound-guided mediastinal biopsy (EBUS TBNA) and medical thoracoscopy.

Awards and recognition 
He received the International Union Against Tuberculosis and Lung Disease Scientific Award, and the 2018 European Union-funded EDCTP Scientific Leadership Award. Other awards have included the Harry Oppenheimer Fellowship Award, the NSTF BHP-Billiton Research award, and MRC Scientific Achievement Award (Platinum). He has been profiled in The Lancet, the Business Day newspaper, IOL, News24, and Carte Blanche, a high-profile news programme in South Africa.

Leadership 
He serves or has served on the editorial board of the journals American Journal of Respiratory and Critical Care Medicine, Lancet Respiratory Medicine, PLOS One, and Scientific Reports, amongst others. He is a former president of the South African Thoracic Society,  is the founder and co-director of the charity, Free of TB, which provides support and healthcare to poor and needy persons afflicted with TB.

See also
London School of Hygiene & Tropical Medicine
University College London

References 

1969 births
Living people
Academic staff of the University of Cape Town
Members of the Academy of Science of South Africa
University of the Witwatersrand alumni